The Holliday-Dorsey-Fife House in Fayetteville, Georgia, one block west of the city's courthouse square, was built in 1847. It was listed on the National Register of Historic Places in 2008.

Description and history 
It is an antebellum Greek Revival-style house. It was built in 1847, but a major renovation and expansion in 1855 created its current appearance. It was built for Dr. John Stiles Holliday who practiced medicine in the house from 1847 to 1865.

The city of Fayetteville purchased the house in 1999 and it was subsequently used for a local history museum.

References

External links
 Holliday-Dorsey-Fife House Museum

Houses on the National Register of Historic Places in Georgia (U.S. state)
Museums in Fayette County, Georgia
History museums in Georgia (U.S. state)
Houses completed in 1847
Greek Revival houses in Georgia (U.S. state)